For Valour is a 1928 British silent war film directed by G. B. Samuelson and starring Dallas Cairns, Mary Rorke and Roy Travers. It was part of a cycle of 1920s British films portraying the First World War. It was generally poorly received by critics.

Cast
 Dallas Cairns   
 Roy Travers   
 Mary Rorke
 Marjorie Stallor

References

Bibliography
 Low, Rachael. History of the British Film, 1918-1929. George Allen & Unwin, 1971.
 Wood, Linda. British Films 1927-1939. British Film Institute, 1986.

External links

1928 films
1928 war films
British war films
Films directed by G. B. Samuelson
British silent feature films
Films set in the 1910s
British World War I films
British black-and-white films
1920s English-language films
1920s British films